Helmut Grollmus (8 January 1918 – 19 June 1944) was a Luftwaffe fighter ace and recipient of the Knight's Cross of the Iron Cross during World War II. Helmuth Grollmus was credited with 75 aerial victories during World War II. In 1944 he was killed in action during a dogfight over Finland.

Career
Grollmus was born on 8 January 1918 in Lissa, at the time in the Province of Posen, a province of the Kingdom of Prussia. Today Lissa is Leszno in western Poland. Following flight training, Grollmus was posted to the Ergänzungsjagdgruppe of Jagdgeschwader 54 (JG 54—54th Fighter Wing), a supplementary training group, in November 1941. In March 1942, he was transferred to 2. Staffel of JG 54. As part of a Luftwaffe plan to exchange fighter units operating on the Eastern Front with fighter units flying on the Western Front, Grollmus was assigned to 12. Staffel of JG 54 in July 1943 which had been newly formed from elements of 7. Staffel of Jagdgeschwader 26 "Schlageter" (JG 26—26th Fighter Wing) and 4. Staffel of JG 54 and was subordinated to II. Gruppe of JG 54.

He has been credited with 75 aerial victories. He was killed in action over Viipuri, Finland 19 June 1944. Grollmus parachuted out safely but was killed by ground fire. He is buried in the Helsinki-Hietaniemi Cemetery.

Summary of career

Aerial victory claims
According to Spick, Grollmus was credited with 75 aerial victories claimed in an unknown number missions on the Eastern Front. Mathews and Foreman, authors of Luftwaffe Aces — Biographies and Victory Claims, researched the German Federal Archives and found records for 68 aerial victory claims, all of which claimed on the Eastern Front.

Victory claims were logged to a map-reference (PQ = Planquadrat), for example "PQ 10163". These sectors were then subdivided into 36 smaller units to give a location area 3 × 4 km in size.

Awards
 Honour Goblet of the Luftwaffe on 1 November 1943 as Unteroffizier and pilot
German Cross in Gold on 12 December 1943 as Feldwebel in the 12./Jagdgeschwader 54
Knight's Cross of the Iron Cross on 6 October 1944 as Leutnant and pilot in the II./Jagdgeschwader 54

See also
 List of Knight's Cross of the Iron Cross recipients (G)
 List of World War II aces from Germany
 List of World War II flying aces

Notes

References

Citations

Bibliography

External links
Traces of War

1918 births
1944 deaths
Luftwaffe  personnel killed in World War II
German World War II flying aces
Luftwaffe pilots
People from Leszno
Recipients of the Gold German Cross
Recipients of the Knight's Cross of the Iron Cross
Burials at Hietaniemi Cemetery